Bruland is a Norwegian surname. Notable people with the surname include:

Anders Trulsson Bruland (1770–1818), Norwegian civil servant and politician
Bjarte Bruland (born 1969), Norwegian politician
Øyvind S. Bruland (born 1952), Norwegian oncologist
Sverre Bruland (1923–2013), Norwegian trumpeter and conductor

Norwegian-language surnames